Triploechus is a genus of bee flies, insects in the family Bombyliidae. There are about 10 described species in Triploechus.

Species
These 10 species belong to the genus Triploechus:
 Triploechus angustipennis Edwards, 1937 c g
 Triploechus bellus (Philippi, 1865) c
 Triploechus divisus Cresson, 1919 c g
 Triploechus heteronevrus (Macquart, 1850) c g
 Triploechus luridus Hall, 1975 i c g
 Triploechus novus (Williston, 1893) i c g b
 Triploechus pallipes Edwards, 1937 c g
 Triploechus sackeni (Williston, 1893) i c g
 Triploechus stagei Hall, 1975 i c g
 Triploechus vierecki Cresson, 1919 c g
Data sources: i = ITIS, c = Catalogue of Life, g = GBIF, b = Bugguide.net

References

Further reading

 

Bombyliidae genera
Articles created by Qbugbot